The Nachtigal Hydroelectric Power Station is a 420 megawatt run-of-the-river hydroelectric power station under development in Cameroon across the Sanaga River, which harnesses the energy of the Nachtigal Falls. The development rights were granted to Nachtigal Hydro Power Company (NHPC), a company owned by a consortium comprising (a) Électricité de France (b) International Finance Corporation and (c) the Government of Cameroon. A 35-year power purchase agreement is in place, between Eneo Cameroon S.A. and NHPC.

Location

Overview
The design calls for a gravity dam with a power potential of 420 megawatts, powered by seven turbines, each with a capacity of 60 megawatts.

Once the high voltage transmission line is constructed and operational, ownership, operation and maintenance will transfer to  National Electricity Construction Company (Sonatrel).

Ownership
The power station is owned by the special purpose company named Nachtigal Hydro Power Company (NHPC). The table below illustrates the shareholding in NHPC.

Construction costs
The estimated costs for the dam and power plant was €1.2 billion in 2018. Approximately €300 million (25 percent) was raised internally by the NHPC consortium as equity investment. The remaining amount, about €900 million, was borrowed from the eleven  international financiers and four Cameroonian banks. Some of the lenders to this project include the following:

 African Development Bank
 Africa Finance Corporation
 French Development Agency
 Proparco
 International Finance Corporation
 Societe Generale des Banques au Cameroun
 Standard Chartered Cameroon
 Emerging Africa Infrastructure Fund
 FMO (Netherlands)
 European Investment Bank

Timeline and commissioning
In December 2021, Afrik21 reported that the first 60 megawatt turbine was expected to be commissioned in July 2023. The final and seventh of equally rated turbines is expected to come online in July 2024.

See also
 List of power stations in Cameroon
 Memve'ele Hydroelectric Power Station

References

External links

  Cameroon: GE Renewable Energy to supply seven turbines for Nachtigal project As of 17 March 2019.
 Cameroon’s Nachtigal Taps New Possibilities for Clean Power As of May 2019.

Hydroelectric power stations in Cameroon